This article is about the particular significance of the year 1847 to Wales and its people.

Incumbents

Lord Lieutenant of Anglesey – Henry Paget, 1st Marquess of Anglesey 
Lord Lieutenant of Brecknockshire – Penry Williams (until 16 January); John Lloyd Vaughan Watkins (from 17 February)
Lord Lieutenant of Caernarvonshire – Peter Drummond-Burrell, 22nd Baron Willoughby de Eresby 
Lord Lieutenant of Cardiganshire – William Edward Powell
Lord Lieutenant of Carmarthenshire – George Rice, 3rd Baron Dynevor 
Lord Lieutenant of Denbighshire – Robert Myddelton Biddulph   
Lord Lieutenant of Flintshire – Sir Stephen Glynne, 9th Baronet
Lord Lieutenant of Glamorgan – John Crichton-Stuart, 2nd Marquess of Bute 
Lord Lieutenant of Merionethshire – Edward Lloyd-Mostyn, 2nd Baron Mostyn
Lord Lieutenant of Monmouthshire – Capel Hanbury Leigh
Lord Lieutenant of Montgomeryshire – Edward Herbert, 2nd Earl of Powis
Lord Lieutenant of Pembrokeshire – Sir John Owen, 1st Baronet
Lord Lieutenant of Radnorshire – John Walsh, 1st Baron Ormathwaite

Bishop of Bangor – Christopher Bethell 
Bishop of Llandaff – Edward Copleston 
Bishop of St Asaph – Thomas Vowler Short 
Bishop of St Davids – Connop Thirlwall

Events
14 January - All thirteen members of the Point of Ayr lifeboat crew are drowned when it capsizes off Rhyl.
8 April - John Jones (Shoni Sguborfawr) is transferred from Norfolk Island to Tasmania.
In the UK general election:
Sir Thomas Frankland Lewis becomes MP for Radnor Boroughs.
Sir Stephen Glynne, 9th Baronet, loses his Flintshire seat to Edward Lloyd-Mostyn for the second time.
24 May - Five people are killed in the Dee bridge disaster, when Robert Stephenson's railway bridge on the Chester and Holyhead Railway at Chester collapses.
1 July - Publication of the government report on education in Wales (the "Blue Books"), containing opinions hostile to Welsh culture.
Prince Albert, is unsuccessfully challenged for the chancellorship of the University of Cambridge by The Earl of Powis. The winning margin is less than 120 votes.
Sir William Robert Grove is awarded the medal of the Royal Society.

Arts and literature

New books
Reports of the Commissioners of Inquiry into the state of education in Wales
John Lloyd - Poems
Morris Williams (Nicander) - Llyfr yr Homiliau

Music
John Mills (Ieuan Glan Alarch) - Y Salmydd Eglwysig

Births
27 January - Owen Owens Roberts, choirmaster and conductor (died 1926)
9 February - Hugh Price Hughes, Methodist social reformer (died 1902)
22 April - Charles Henry Wynn, landowner (died 1911)
20 June - Evan Thomas Davies (Dyfrig), clergyman and author (died 1927)
10 July - Alfred Neobard Palmer, historian and ancient monuments inspector (died 1915)
12 September - John Crichton-Stuart, 3rd Marquess of Bute, Cardiff landowner (died 1900)
13 October - Owen Owen, draper (died 1910)
14 November - Roland Rogers, musician (died 1927)
date unknown - Llewelyn Kenrick, footballer (died 1933)

Deaths
13 February - Sharon Turner, historian, 78
16 February - Taliesin Williams, poet and author, son of Iolo Morganwg, 59
17 March - Sir Harford Jones Brydges, diplomat and author, 83
29 March - Humphrey Gwalchmai, Calvinistic Methodist leader, 59
7 June - David Mushet, Scottish metallurgist (in Monmouth), 74
27 September - Lucy Thomas, colliery owner ('The Mother of the Welsh Steam Coal Trade')
6 October - John Evans (Methodist), 68

References

Wales